Natasha Smith is a Canadian international rugby league player. She has also played rugby union for Carleton Ravens

References

Living people
Canadian female rugby league players
Canada women's national rugby league team players
Year of birth missing (living people)
Place of birth missing (living people)
Carleton Ravens players
Universiade medalists in rugby sevens
Universiade bronze medalists for Canada
Medalists at the 2013 Summer Universiade